Tennis South Africa (TSA) is the national governing body for the sport of tennis in South Africa. It is a not-for-profit organization, which "invests its proceeds to promote and develop the growth of tennis, from the grass-roots to the professional levels and to raise funds for and on behalf of tennis players and the game of tennis within the Republic of South Africa". The TSA is affiliated to both International Tennis Federation and Confederation of African Tennis. The association was created to standardise rules and regulations and to promote and develop the growth of tennis in South Africa.

Affiliate members
This is a list of provincial affiliated members of TSA, according to the constitution of TSA the affiliation of members has to be revised after fixed interval of period.
Boland Tennis Association
Border Tennis Association
Tennis Eastern Province
Eden Tennis Association
Free State Tennis Association
Gauteng Central Tennis Association
Gauteng East Tennis Association
Gauteng North Tennis Association
KwaZulu Natal Tennis Association
Limpopo Tennis Association
Mpumalanga Tennis Association
Northern Cape Tennis Association
North West Tennis Association
Western Province Tennis

Board members
The board of the association comprises not less than nine and not more than twelve members; as described by the constitution of association. The board should at all time comprise at least 50% of members representing previously disadvantaged communities. The board members appointed for the term of three years. The current board members of the association are:

See also
South Africa Davis Cup team
South Africa Fed Cup team
South Africa at the Hopman Cup
Women's tennis in South Africa

References

External links
 Tennis South Africa

National members of the Confederation of African Tennis
Tennis
Tennis in South Africa
Sports organizations established in 2000
Organisations based in Pretoria
2000 establishments in South Africa